The Cardus Education Survey: A Rising Tide Lifts All Boats (Cardus II) is a Canadian report measuring non-government school effects in service of the Canadian public good. The first of its kind to explore the topic in Canada, the study was a survey from a representative sample of graduates of government and non-government schools ages 24–39. The data included graduates from schools in all provinces except for Quebec, which is included separately in the report. The data was collected in March 2012. The report was made available on September 26, 2012, at http://www.cardus.ca/research/education/. A Cardus Education Survey was published in the United States in 2011 called Do the Motivations for Private Religious Catholic and Protestant Schooling in North America Align with Graduate Outcomes?(Cardus I), and it was phase one of the overall project. The Cardus Education Survey: A Rising Tide Lifts All Boats was phase two of the project.

Summary of Cardus II Report 

Using educational standards based in various provincial documentation, the report concluded that graduates from various non-government schooling sectors—Separate Catholic, Independent Catholic, Independent Non-religious, Evangelical Christian, and religious home education—exceed in all the measures that the public school sets for itself and do a better job than the public schools. These graduates represent about 8% of Canada's population. The report suggests that non-government schools are important contributors to education in Canada, that they contribute citizens that enhance the public good, and that these schools may have best practices that could be shared across all education systems.

On September 26, 2012, in an interview with Michael Coren, Ray Pennings the chair and coordinator of the Cardus Education Survey described what the report examined.

We show the raw numbers. We control for social economic status and faith background.So we are really saying, you take a hundred kids, same amount of rich and poor, same amount of church and non-church. We have two groups of a 100 kids. We send these to public schools. We send these kids to independent schools. What's the difference in their adult lives?What we are seeing is a cross section of society who are engaged, who are salt of the earth people, and we actually take a look at most measures of civic engagement, not necessarily political engagement, but civic engagement. On most measures, they exceed that of the public school graduate.''The report states that "Canada's government schools perform very well in international rankings, but by many measures, Canada's non-government schools perform at even higher levels."

The executive summary of the report highlighted some of the characteristics of non-government school graduates. These graduates are likely to have stronger families with more children. These graduates are more engaged in neighbourhood and community groups and are involved in cultural initiatives. They vote more than government school graduates vote. They are more generous with their money to a variety of causes and more generous with their time by volunteering more. In particular, Evangelical Protestant school graduates have high satisfaction with the quality of their life and seek to contribute to the public good even though they feel that the culture makes them feel unwelcome. Graduates of independent non-religious schools look for fulfillment expectations in their jobs, while graduates of Evangelical Protestants schools and religious homeschooling understand a strong vocational calling. These graduates focus on educating for employment rather than influence, leaving higher education when they have attained what they need for their future careers. Reflecting back on their secondary education, these graduates have high satisfaction and feel that they were prepared well for later life. Religious attributes of conviction, spiritual formation and practices are evident for Evangelical Protestants and graduates of religious home education, while graduates of separate Catholic schools appear almost identical to those of public school.

 Findings: School Effects on Graduate Outcomes 

This section of the report summarizes the findings from the comparison of graduates
(ages 24 to 39) from six Canadian school sectors: Government, Separate Catholic, Independent Catholic, Independent non-religious, Evangelical Protestant (often called Christian schools), and religious home education (homeschooling families in which the mother regularly attended religious services.) Graduate outcomes are described and discussed under three main themes: cultural, economic, and social engagement; academic achievement; and spiritual formation. The report focuses on the school effect, meaning the impact a high school experience has on individuals and families. They are compared to the government school graduates who are seen as the control group.

 1. Cultural, Economic, and Social Engagement 

Based on the survey, The Cardus Report suggests a number of conclusions about the cultural, economic and social engagement of non-government school graduates. First, in terms of income, there is no significant difference between all the groups compared to government school graduates.

For marital status, Separate Catholic graduates were more likely to have never been married, and more likely to marry at a later age than government school graduates. They were less likely to be divorced or separated, and they were as likely as government school graduates to be living with a partner. Independent Catholic graduates were less likely to be living with a partner or to be divorced or separated, but as likely to be married and marry about the same age as government school graduates. Independent non-religious graduates differed from government school graduates only in being less likely to be divorced or separated. Christian school graduates marry younger and are more likely to be married than any other group. They are also less likely to be divorced or separated and less likely to be living with a partner than graduates of government schools. They are more likely to have more children. Religious home education graduates are somewhat less likely to be divorced or separated and extremely unlikely to be co-habiting. Though they marry at an earlier age, they are somewhat more likely to be married than government school graduates and more likely to have more children.

It suggests that graduates of non-government schools (religious and non-religious) tend to be equally or more involved in politics and culture than are government school graduates.
Independent non-religious graduates act on their feelings of obligation and become involved with political campaigns. Christian school and home school graduates feel the same level of obligation, but do not act on these feelings. Their high level of involvement in other activity could be the cause of this. This trend shows again when answering about environmental issues. Christian school and religious home-educated graduates are notably more likely to feel obligated to care for the environment, but again only the independent non-religious school graduates are significantly more environmentally active than their government school peers.

Cultural activities seemed to be shaped by the graduates' community and family interests. Christian school graduates are more likely to join a choir, while independent non-religious graduates are more likely to enjoy a concert or opera. All non-government school groups read more than their government school peers.

The two groups who felt most prepared to be culturally involved were home school graduates and Independent non-religious school graduates.

Christian school graduates have had more cross-cultural experiences than graduates of other schools. These experiences are identified as "mission" or "development" trips.

Independent non-religious school graduates tend to trust established structures and institutions. Separate Catholic graduates stand out because of their trust in labour unions.
Christian school graduates and religious home educated graduates show more confidence in corporations and the federal government, but less in the institutions of the federal government, the Supreme Court, the media, and the scientific community. This may correspond to the perception that society is negative toward the Christian faith. At the same time, most non-government school graduates feel that the government should do more to solve social problems.

Graduates of Christian schools are more likely that any other group to be satisfied with their lives, but they are less likely to take risks and more likely to conform.

 2. Academic Achievement 

Graduates of independent Catholic schools and independent non-religious schools attain more years of education than government school graduates. Christian school graduates were the same as government school graduates. The home school graduate completed fewer years.

Separate Catholic school graduates, independent Catholic school graduates and independent non-religious school graduates are spread out over high school, college, university undergraduate and master degrees, with the independent non-religious graduate having the highest overall educational attainment. Christian school graduates and religious home educated graduates are more likely to have as their highest educational certification a college diploma rather than a university degree, but when they do go to university, Christian school graduates are more likely to have a master's degree, and home school graduates are more likely to receive a Ph.D.

Non-government school graduates are more likely to call their school experience sheltered. In contrast, they also highly valued their high school experience and saw it as a valuable preparation. Catholic school graduates did not show any difference in valuing their high school experience compared to their public school peers.

 3. Spiritual Formation and Religious Engagement. 

By almost all survey questions, Christian schools and religious home education are affirmed by their graduates in contributing to religious and spiritual formation. They are more effective than all other school categories. These graduates are involved in their church and have done international mission work. They are developing skills for participation and contribution to their communities and neighbourhoods. They are "grounded, contributing, faithful, diligent, conservative, and dependable." The survey's concern is that Catholic school graduates are not different from government school graduates in the faith strength and practice of their faith.

 Findings: School Effects on Graduate Outcomes in Quebec 

The comparison between the results of English-speaking Canada and Quebec showed such strong differences that the Cardus Education team decided that the Quebec results should be considered separately.

Responses from Quebec participants included 173 graduates of fully government-funded schools, including 22 who labeled their school as Catholic; 248 independent Catholic school graduates; and 67 independent non-religious school graduates.

One difference is that students obtain a Quebec high school diploma after successful completion of grade 11, not after grade 12. Another significant difference was that all government schools were officially labeled either Catholic or Protestant until 1997, when a change in Canada's constitution made it possible for the Quebec government to make education less about religion and more about language in 2000 by now labeling all schools as either French-speaking of English-speaking. Participants in the survey had difficulty designating their schools, with some classifying the same schools as Catholic, others as public, and still others as non-religious.

According to Cardus, Quebec has the highest proportion of students going to private high schools in North America (17%). Most of these are Catholic. The Quebec government subsidizes the schools on a per student basis, so that a student's tuition is about one-third of the cost.  About half of the total sample of 500 Quebec students survey identified themselves as coming from a Catholic independent school. The number of graduates of independent non-religious schools was too small to draw any conclusions. What the Cardus study was therefore able to do is compare the Quebec graduates who attended fully funded government schools with those who attended partially funded Catholic independent schools.

Three trends emerged from the surveys. First, graduates of the independent schools had a higher satisfaction with their high school experience. They feel prepared for their roles in society, and they have completed more years of schooling, including more post-secondary education. Second, they are involved in supporting a political candidate or a party, but less likely to protest because of the full-time work schedule that they have. Third, their religious involvement differs very little with their government school counterparts.

In the report, Cardus applauded the work of independent Catholic schools in Quebec for preparing their graduates for their careers and their socio-economic contributions to the province and the country, but Cardus also questioned whether the schools have prepared students for their life of faith.

 Comparing Cardus Survey Phase I (American) with Phase II (Canadian) 

In the two reports, many similarities between the countries are evident. Christian school graduates are more likely to have strong commitments to family, church and faith formation. Graduates are very involved in their churches, in mission trips and in volunteering in non-religious community work. Their views on morality issues are parallel, and both sets of graduates have a sense of a culture around them that is negative toward them.

Three main differences can be seen in the reports. First, Canadian Christian school graduates show a stronger tendency to obtain a master's degree than American Christian graduates. Second, American Christian school graduates donate less and are involved less in political action, but like the Canadians, they agree that they should be involved. Third, Canadian Christian school graduates volunteer outside of their religious congregation more than their American counterparts.

 Cardus Origins 

Cardus is a Canadian think tank "dedicated to the renewal of North American social architecture, drawing on more than 2000 years of Christian social thought". Cardus focuses its research in four areas of North American public life: Cities; Volunteerism, Public-Good Services and Support Programs; Education and Culture; and Work and Economics. It publishes four journals: Comment, Cardus Policy in Public, LexView, and Convivium. Cardus Audio is its podcast. http://www.cardus.ca/organization/about/

The word Cardus comes from the Latin root "cardo". In the Ancient Roman world, the cardo was a street running north to south in a city. Busy with many markets and stores, the cardo, was the center of business and the economy of any Roman town. Cardus uses this image of the busy street saying, "Cardus's wide-angle periodicals, policies, and punditry come together for a renewed vision of North American social architecture, up and down the Cardus—the Main Street."

 Cardus Education Survey Origins 

In December 2007, thirty-seven Christian leaders in education and culture met at a California symposium to explore the through lines that weave Christian education and culture together. Quantified and qualified data was needed to learn more. A discussion paper was then published and followed by a research proposal.

Cardus secured funding from the Richard and Helen DeVos Foundation based in Grand Rapids, Michigan; the William Voortman Foundation based in Hamilton, Ontario; and the Van Lunen Foundation based in Chicago, Illinois. The William Voortman Fund is a private foundation in Waterdown, Ontario, which supports selected Christian organizations, with a focus on education in Ontario. The Richard and Helen DeVos Foundation supports conservative policy and politics. The foundation has been a supporter of both Hope College and Calvin College, both West Michigan Christian colleges. The Van Lunen Foundation has been a supporter of Christian education by establishing the Van Lunen Center for Executive Management in Christian Schools established at Calvin College in January 2007. The University of Notre Dame joined in research partnership with an in-kind contribution to the project. The combined value of the funded and in-kind contributions to the project was $1,150,000.

In August 2011, the first phase of the project published, Do the Motivations for Private Religious Catholic and Protestant Schooling in North America Align with Graduate Outcomes? The research goals of this phase focused the connection between the motivations of Christian education and the outcomes, especially in academic excellence, spiritual formation, and cultural engagement. The Phase I report says,The impacts and effects of Christian schools in the U.S. and Canada have never before been studied in a broad international examination. If the effects of Christian schooling can be better understood, more informed discussions can take place on the role of the Christian school sector in students' lives, families and the larger society. The Cardus Education Survey has just this purpose- to determine the alignment between the motivations and outcomes of Christian education, setting a benchmark for further study of Christian schooling.''

The Research Team 

Ray Pennings served as the chair and coordinator and is a senior fellow and director of research at Cardus.

Dr. David Sikkink was the head of quantitative studies. He completed his doctorate in sociology at the University of North Carolina-Chapel Hill, and has been in Sociology at Notre Dame since 1999.

Dr. Deani Van Pelt served as the author for the report and is an associate professor of education at Redeemer University College, where she serves as director of teacher education.

Harro Van Brummelen served as an advisor and is former dean of education and professor emeritus at Trinity Western University, and currently the executive director of Christian Studies International.

Amy von Heyking served as an advisor and is an associate professor in the Faculty of Education at the University of Lethbridge.

Methodology of Quantitative Research 

The American Survey (Phase I)used two web-based surveys. Questions about schooling history were included in the Science of Generosity Survey conducted in 2010. This survey was conducted by survey firm Knowledge Networks. This survey included nearly 2000 randomly sampled Americans ages 24 to 39 who completed a 60-minute survey. The survey included questions about academic excellence, spiritual formation, and cultural engagement. Toward the end of the survey, participants were asked to identify the type of high school that they attended. Choices included public, Catholic, conservative Protestant or "Christian school", other Christian, non-Christian religious, non-religious private or home-school.  The second survey, also done by Knowledge Networks, included 1,003 graduates of non-government schools and 505 graduates of government schools. Graduates were sorted by the type of school, such as Catholic, evangelical Protestant, non-religious private, and home school. The survey includes questions about academic excellence, spiritual formation, and cultural engagement. Participants responded to a thirty-minute survey.

The Canadian Survey (Phase II) was a parallel survey. A survey of randomly selected Canadians was administered by Vision Critical, a division of Angus Reid. This survey included a large oversample of non-government school graduates that was limited to participants between 23 and 40 years of age. Respondents chose from the following options: Catholic, conservative Protestant or "Christian school," other Protestant school, or other type of independent school. In addition, respondents were asked the name and location of the high school from which they graduated. From these responses, participants were sorted into categories of public, separate Catholic, independent Catholic, non-religious independent, "Christian," and home school.  The forty-five-minute survey included questions about academic excellence, spiritual formation, and cultural engagement. In order to make the survey instrument comparable to the United States sample of the Cardus Education Study, several questions were replicated from the Knowledge Networks survey.

The distribution of English-speaking, non-government high school participants in the analysis was as follows:
 683 Public
 368 Separate Catholic
 49 Independent Catholic
 110 Conservative Protestant or "Christian School"
 112 Non-religious independent
 34 Religious home school 

The small number of home school graduates that were identified puts into question the validity of the sample. Other larger surveys have been done that may reflect more clearly on the academic excellence, spiritual formation and cultural engagement of home school graduates.

Although the Cardus Education Survey had participants from Islamic schools
(5), Jewish schools (15), Sikh schools (2), mainline Protestant schools (22), and non-religiously defined home school (17), the Cardus team decided that the numbers in each category were insufficient to study them as distinct groups, and they could not naturally be collapsed into another category. Responses from graduates of these categories were not analyzed.

References 

Ajah Fundtracker (2012). William Voortman fund. Retrieved from https://web.archive.org/web/20160305015243/http://ajah.ca/demo/fo/14336

Arai, A. B. (2000). Reasons for home schooling in Canada. Canadian Journal of Education / Revue Canadienne De l'Éducation, 25(3), 204–217.

Calvin College (2012) DeVos Communications Center. Retrieved from http://www.calvin.edu/map/devos/

Cardus (2012) Research projects education and culture. Retrieved from http://www.cardus.ca/research/education/publications/

Cardus (2012) The organization. Retrieved from http://www.cardus.ca/organization/about/

Hope College (2012) DeVos Fieldhouse. Retrieved from http://www.hope.edu/resources/devos/

Sun News (September 26, 2012) Why private schools make better people. Retrieved from http://www.sunnewsnetwork.ca/video/why-private-schools-make-better-people/1863112169001

Pennings, R, Seel, D.J., and Sikkink, D, Van Pelt, D, Wiens, K (2011) Cardus education survey. do the motivations for private religious Catholic and Protestant schooling in North America align with graduate outcomes? Hamilton, Canada: Cardus.

Pennings, R.; Sikkink, D.; Van Pelt, D.; Van Brummelen, H.; and von Heyking,(2012) Cardus education survey. a rising tide lifts all boats. Hamilton, Canada: Cardus.

Van Lunen Center (2012) History of the Van Lunen Center. Retrieved from http://www.calvin.edu/vanlunen/about/history.html

Van Pelt, D, Seel, DJ (2007) The California table connecting education and culture a work research foundation paper. Ontario, CA: Cardus.

2012 in Canada
2012 in education
Education in Canada
Surveys (human research)